Jerry Bradford Reynolds (born April 2, 1970) is a former American football offensive lineman in the National Football League (NFL) for the Dallas Cowboys and the New York Giants. He played college football at the University of Nevada, Las Vegas.

Early years
Reynolds attended Highlands High School. He walked-on at the University of Nevada, Las Vegas. As a freshman, he appeared in 8 games. As a sophomore, he became a starter at right tackle, missing the last game with a back bruise. He started 21 games over his final two seasons.

Professional career

Cincinnati Bengals
Reynolds was selected by the Cincinnati Bengals in the sixth round (184th overall) of the 1994 NFL Draft. On August 28, he was waived and signed to the practice squad two days laters.

Dallas Cowboys
On November 1, 1994, he was signed by the Dallas Cowboys from the Bengals' practice squad, after Erik Williams suffered a season-ending knee injury in a car accident. He was a backup player and was released on August 27, 1995.

New York Giants
On August 29, 1995, he was signed by the New York Giants to play guard and for depth purposes. The next year, he was moved to tackle. On February 11, 1999, he was released after only starting 2 games during his time with the team.

References

1970 births
Living people
People from Fort Thomas, Kentucky
Players of American football from Kentucky
American football offensive linemen
UNLV Rebels football players
Cincinnati Bengals players
Dallas Cowboys players
New York Giants players